An obligate aerobe is an organism that requires oxygen to grow.  Through cellular respiration, these organisms use oxygen to metabolise substances, like sugars or fats, to obtain energy. In this type of respiration, oxygen serves as the terminal electron acceptor for the electron transport chain.  Aerobic respiration has the advantage of yielding more energy (adenosine triphosphate or ATP) than fermentation or anaerobic respiration, but obligate aerobes are subject to high levels of oxidative stress.

Examples 
Among organisms, almost all animals, most fungi, and several bacteria are obligate aerobes. Examples of obligately aerobic bacteria include Mycobacterium tuberculosis (acid-fast), Pseudomonas aeruginosa (Gram-negative), Bacillus (Gram-positive), and Nocardia asteroides (Gram-positive).  With the exception of the yeasts, most fungi are obligate aerobes.  Also, almost all algae are obligate aerobes.

A unique obligate aerobe is Streptomyces coelicolor which is gram-positive, soil-dwelling, and belongs to the phylum Actinomycetota. It is unique because the genome of this obligate aerobe encodes numerous enzymes with functions that are usually attributed to anaerobic metabolism in facultatively and strictly anaerobic bacteria.

Survival strategies 
When obligate aerobes are in a temporarily oxygen-deprived environment, they need survival strategies to avoid death. Under these conditions, Mycobacterium smegmatis can quickly switch between fermentative hydrogen production and hydrogen oxidation with either oxygen or fumarate reduction depending on the availability of electron acceptor. This example is the first time that hydrogen production has been seen in an obligate aerobe. It also confirms the fermentation in a mycobacterium and is evidence that hydrogen plays a role in survival as well as growth.

Problems can also arise in oxygen-rich environments, most commonly attributed to oxidative stress. This occurrence is when there is an imbalance of free radicals and antioxidants in the cells of the organism, largely due to pollution and radiation in the environment. The strategy that obligate aerobes utilize to survive this phenomenon is to utilize the organism's immune system to correct the imbalance.

See also 
 Aerobic respiration
 Anaerobic respiration
 Fermentation
 Obligate anaerobe
 Facultative anaerobe
 Microaerophile

References 

Microbiology